= Crimean Tatar =

Crimean Tatar may refer to:

- Crimean Tatars, an ethnic group
- Crimean Tatar language, a language of the Crimean Tatars
